Clarissa Cristina dos Santos (born March 10, 1988) is a Brazilian professional basketball player previously played for the Chicago Sky of the Women's National Basketball Association (WNBA).. Most recently she has played for Basket Landes in the Euroleague Women.

Early life and career
She began practicing sports at 13 on the Miécimo da Silva Sports Complex, and one day, as the basketball court was right along the athletics field where she practiced discus throw Santos was invited to play that sport. Eventually it became her priority. In 2005, she joined the young teams of the club, and one year later was already in the adult team of Fluminense.

Player profile
Clarissa excelled at rebounds, a statistic she topped in the Brazilian championship for two straight years. She was champion in 2012 with the Americana team.

National Team and international competition
For the Brazil women's national basketball team, Clarissa won a bronze medal at the 2011 Pan American Games, and was champion of the 2011 FIBA Americas Championship for Women which qualified Brazil for the 2012 Summer Olympics. In the women's event, Brazil fell at the group stage with only one win, but Santos lead the rebounds statistic.  She was also part of the Brazilian team that played at the Rio Olympics.

References

1988 births
Living people
Basketball players at the 2011 Pan American Games
Basketball players at the 2012 Summer Olympics
Basketball players at the 2016 Summer Olympics
Basketball players at the 2019 Pan American Games
Brazilian expatriate basketball people in the United States
Brazilian women's basketball players
Chicago Sky players
Olympic basketball players of Brazil
Pan American Games bronze medalists for Brazil
Pan American Games medalists in basketball
Power forwards (basketball)
Basketball players from Rio de Janeiro (city)
Medalists at the 2019 Pan American Games
Medalists at the 2011 Pan American Games